Cheboksary is the capital city of the Chuvash Republic, Russia.

Cheboksary may also refer to:
Cheboksary Urban Okrug, a municipal formation which the city of republic significance of Cheboksary in the Chuvash Republic, Russia is incorporated as
Cheboksary Airport, an airport in the Chuvash Republic, Russia
Cheboksary Dam, a hydroelectric dam on the Volga River, Russia
Cheboksary Reservoir, an artificial lake formed by the Cheboksary Dam in Russia
Cheboksary, Tambov Oblast, a rural locality (a village) in Nikiforovsky District of Tambov Oblast, Russia
Cheboksary railway station, a railway station in the city of Cheboksary, on the Gorky Railway